= Dunhill, Gauteng =

Dunhill
- Location within Gauteng Location within South Africa
- Coordinates: 26°8′34″S 28°6′2″E
- Country: South Africa
- Province: Gauteng
- Municipality: City of Johannesburg
- Time zone: UTC+2 (SAST)
- Postal code (street): 2192
- Area code: 2192

Dunhill is a suburb within Johannesburg, South Africa. Dunhurst Estate, a residential complex, is the only development in the suburb. The complex was built in 2005. It borders the suburbs Fairmount, Glensan, and Sandringham.
